The 2013–14 St. John's Red Storm men's basketball team represented St. John's University during the 2013–14 NCAA Division I men's basketball season. The team was coached by Steve Lavin in his fourth year at the school. Saint John's home games were played at Carnesecca Arena and Madison Square Garden and the team was a founding member of the new Big East Conference. They finished the season 20–13, 10–8 in Big East play to finish in three-way tie for third place. They lost in the quarterfinals of the Big East tournament to Providence. They were invited to the National Invitation Tournament, where they lost to Robert Morris in the first round.

Off season

Departures

Class of 2013 signees

Roster

Schedule

|-
!colspan=9 style="background:#FF0000; color:#FFFFFF;"| Exhibition

|-
!colspan=9 style="background:#FF0000; color:#FFFFFF;"| Non-Conference Regular Season

|-
!colspan=9 style="background:#FF0000; color:#FFFFFF;"| Big East Conference Regular Season

|-
!colspan=9 style="background:#FF0000; color:#FFFFFF;"| Big East tournament

|-
!colspan=9 style="background:#FF0000; color:#FFFFFF;"| NIT

References

St. John's
St. John's Red Storm men's basketball seasons
St. John's
St John
St John